The 1963 Provincial Speedway League was the fourth season of the Provincial League in the United Kingdom. Thirteen speedway teams took part.

Season summary
Wolverhampton won the league but there was controversy at the end of the year when Wolverhampton refused to move up to the National League  which was dwindling in numbers. This would lead to the Provincial League running outside of the jurisdiction of the Speedway Control Board in 1964. At the start of the year Neath had folded, and their place was taken by the new track at St Austell. After finishing at the bottom of the table the previous year, Bradford and Leicester were no longer running due to financial difficulties and Plymouth had also withdrawn. Long Eaton returned to competitive racing after ten years, a new track opened at Hackney, and Rayleigh returned under new ownership after a missing the 1962 season. New Cross Rangers also returned but closed in August, never to re-open.

Final table

M = Matches; W = Wins; D = Draws; L = Losses; Pts = Total Points

New Cross Rangers resigned in mid-season - record expunged.

Top Five Riders (League only)

Provincial League Knockout Cup
The 1963 Provincial League Knockout Cup was the fourth edition of the Knockout Cup for the Provincial League teams. Cradley Heathens were the winners.

First round

Second round

Semi-finals

Final

See also
List of United Kingdom Speedway League Champions
Knockout Cup (speedway)

References

Speedway Provincial League
Provincial Speedway
Provincial Speedway